Megalopyge lecca is a moth of the family Megalopygidae. It was described by Herbert Druce in 1890.

References

Moths described in 1890
Megalopygidae